Hunting Scenes from Bavaria is a 1969 West German film directed by Peter Fleischmann. It is based on a play of the same name by Martin Sperr, who also played the main role in the film. It was chosen as West Germany's official submission to the 42nd Academy Awards for Best Foreign Language Film, but did not manage to receive a nomination.

Plot 

In a small village in Lower Bavaria, twenty-year-old mechanic Abram (Martin Sperr) is suspected of being homosexual. He is not the only outsider, as also present are a foreign guest worker and the maidservant Hannelore (Angela Winkler), who is defamed as a whore by the villagers. When Abram knifes Hannelore the situation escalates and the hysterical villagers try to hunt Abram down.

Production 

The film was shot in the small village of Unholzing in Postau near Landshut. Due to the controversial topic of the film, the film crew had to deal with the sometimes hostile reactions of the villagers.

Awards
Hunting Scenes from Bavaria won two Bundesfilmpreise in 1969:

 Filmband in Gold for Best Actor (Michael Strixner)
 Filmband in Silber for Best Feature Film (Peter Fleischmann)

See also
 List of submissions to the 42nd Academy Awards for Best Foreign Language Film
 List of German submissions for the Academy Award for Best Foreign Language Film

References

External links

 Jagdszenen aus Niederbayern at filmportal.de/en

1969 films
1969 LGBT-related films
1969 drama films
German LGBT-related films
German drama films
West German films
1960s German-language films
German films based on plays
Films directed by Peter Fleischmann
Films produced by Rob Houwer
Films set in Bavaria
German vigilante films
1969 directorial debut films
1960s German films